Caryswood is a historic home located near Evington, Campbell County, Virginia.  It was built about 1855, and is a two-story frame building in an “L” configuration, which is covered by a low, hipped roof. It has a two-story, rear addition, with a one-story kitchen addition. The house is covered in flush (presumably ship-lapped or tongue-and-groove) siding, which creates a regular, smooth, somewhat monolithic appearance. The house has Italianate and Greek Revival decorative details.  Also on the property are an 1856 stable, the remains of an icehouse, a smokehouse, and an office.

It was listed on the National Register of Historic Places in 2010.

References

Houses on the National Register of Historic Places in Virginia
Italianate architecture in Virginia
Greek Revival houses in Virginia
Houses completed in 1855
Houses in Campbell County, Virginia
National Register of Historic Places in Campbell County, Virginia